La Vôge-les-Bains is a commune in the department of Vosges, eastern France. The municipality was established on 1 January 2017 by merger of the former communes of Bains-les-Bains (the seat), Harsault and Hautmougey.

See also 
Communes of the Vosges department

References 

Communes of Vosges (department)